"Delorean Dynamite" is a song by Norwegian DJ Todd Terje. It was released as the third single from his debut studio album, It's Album Time, on 10 February 2014. A 12" vinyl version was released on 28 May 2014. A music video for the song was uploaded on Terje's YouTube channel. The song was featured on the soundtrack for the video game Forza Horizon 2.

Music video
The official music video for "Delorean Dynamite" was released on 21 October 2014. Directed by Espen Friberg, the video is an advertisement for a used DeLorean being sold by a fellow Norwegian man named Frank.

Track listing
 Olsen — OLS007

Charts

Release history

References

2014 songs
2014 singles
Todd Terje songs